Thuis is a Belgian television soap opera, which airs on één, which is in the hands of VRT, the national broadcasting channel of the Dutch-speaking region of Belgium, Flanders.

Thuis first aired on 23 December 1995, featuring Pol Goossen, Rik Andries and the late .

Thuis grew to become Flanders' number one soap, gaining 900,000 viewers (compared to the highest rated TV show, receives 1.5 million viewers), and therefore beating competing for channel vtm's soap operas Familie and former series Wittekerke (a fictional town). Thuis is currently in its 26st season, and has aired 5,000 episodes as of 16 April 2021.

Plot

Season 11
Following a long period of doubt, Robert Swerts is discovered to be the serial killer and rapist and is arrested. Renzo Fierens is arrested for drug dealing. Dr. Geert Smeekens replaces Michael Bastiaens in the doctor's office alongside Ann De Decker. Jenny Verbeeck - Van Goethem returns from the south of France, while Eva Verbist and Nandje Reimers leaves due to Nandje's leukemia.

Season 12

Eva begins a relationship with Maarten who turns out to be just as jealous and obsessed as Jan, his brother and her late husband. He kills his mother, Mathilde, for poisoning Eva to prevent her leaving the country and for and killing his father who learned of this. Maarten also takes over the health business of Werner, his rival for Eva's affection. Femke discovers that Maarten is the culprit and warns Werner. However, Maarten restrains Eva in their home and sets it on fire so that he, Eva, and her son, Nandje, can be together in death.

Season 13

This season saw the introduction of Sonja and Ludo De Backer, Dorien's parents. Later on this season, civil law notary Peter Vlerick, played by Geert Hunaerts, will be introduced as a Bastiaens family friend. Meanwhile, Lien Van de Kelder ended her three-episode guest appearance. However, she was slated to return as Sofie Bastiaens on 21 November 2007.

At the end of last season, Kristin Arras her character Mathilde Reimers was murdered and written out. She's the only character to disappear from the main cast from season 12. The characters introduced last season and part of the main cast, but not yet of the opening titles were all added to the opening titles. These were Viktor Corthout and Sandrine Verbeelen (first individual shots in intro in episode 3 of season 13), Dorien De Backer and Youssef Bakali (first individual shots in intro in episode 4 of season 13). Daisy a supporting character in season 12 was also added to the main cast and the opening titles (first individual shot in intro in episode 4 of season 13). It wasn't quite certain if she would play a more important role this season. Surprisingly, Julia was also added to the opening titles, and had her first individual shot in the intro in episode 2 of season 13. Julia only appeared in a few episodes of season 12 and was considered a guest character. She still has to appear this season.

It was announced in early 2007 that Marie Van Goethem played by Patsy Vandermeeren, Werner Van Sevenant played by Peter Van Asbrouck, Eva Verbist played by Nathalie Wijnants and Leontien Vercammen played by Marijke Hofkens will leave onscreen in 2007.

Season 14
Eric and Martine's daughter Sofie is missing, last seen at a wedding.  Her body is found and a police investigation begins. Nancy tries to reveal that Femke's new lover, Mike, is actually Femke's father. Mike tries to kill Nancy, and Femke suspects Mike is Sofie's killer. Mike stalks Femke and is fatally stabbed by Erik, who is absolved of murder. Femke later accepts an inheritance left by Mike and falls in love with Peter.

Leo makes a bad investment, defrauded by Mike, and Femke helps return the money. Dorien falls in love with classmate Jonas, threatening her marriage to Sam. Sam and Dorien move to Lanzarote to pursue her dream. Waldek falls for Kris who turns him down after a passionate weekend.

Peggy returns to have an abortion, but agrees for Ann to adopt the child. Jenny's daughter, Bianca, is to marry her young love, Tom De Decker. Tom arrives to donate a kidney to his ill mother, Marianne, and Peggy reveals that Tom is the father of her child, Sandrine. Not wishing to cause a break between Tom and Bianca, Peggy leaves. However, Bianca cancels the marriage plans and starts a relationship with Mo.

Waldek quits his job and Luc tells Rosa about the affair, so that she decides to divorce. Cois and Julia marry and depart for their honeymoon. Katrien and Paulien decide to throw a party but their father forbids it; they drug him and he falls into a coma.

Season 15
There is a custody dispute as Tom and Peggy want to keep their baby. The court decides that Ann will be Sandrine's adoptive mother.

Eddy tries to prevent Jelena's deportation by faking a marriage, but is unsuccessful. She asks Waldek to try and they fall in love. When Joery learns, he asks Eddy to kill Waldek in a car accident, but Eddy ends up hitting Mo and Bianca.

Herman, an ex-lover of Simonne, arrives with his son, Bram, who is rebellious until Herman becomes sick. Simonne falls in love with Herman, who dies. She promises Herman to take care of Bram until he is an adult, but Frank is not pleased when Bram moves in.

Season 16
Before his death, Herman tells Frank where his son Bram can find  of black-market money, but Frank keeps the money for himself. Franky and Simonne convince Frank to give Bram the money in stock, but a dispute causes Frank to change his mind and Bram stabs him. Franky claims responsibility and spends several weeks in youth prison. It is later revealed that Franky did this because he wants to be in a relationship with Bram, and Franky is disowned by his father for being gay.

Rosa distances herself from her ex-husband, Waldek, by pursuing Luc, and they become engaged. However, she feels pity for Waldek, who can't get over Jelena's death. In the end, she fails to appear at the wedding ceremony, choosing to be with Waldek.

Femke's business is almost broke. Raffael, who claims to be her half-brother, moves to Belgium and falls in love with Femke. Femke rejects him, and Raffael sets hotel Ter Smissen on fire during Rosa and Waldek's wedding party. At the same time, Luc and Freddy get into a fight over stealing Sanitechniek stock for insurance fraud; Freddy threatens to tell the police but Luc knocks him onto a table, breaking his neck.

Paulien becomes pregnant and Bram changes his mind a few times but concludes that he doesn't want to be a father and that Pauline should have an abortion. Upset, Pauline reveals to Simonne that Bram stabbed Frank, and Frank launches a raid on Bram.

Tom and Peggy buy Femke's loft, which needs renovation. They stay with Marianne though Peggy can't stand her. Later, it is revealed that Marianne paid Sanitechniek to delay the work.

Season 17
Marianne is found guilty of the Ter Smissen hotel fire and Freddy's death, and must pay a large sum to Rosa and Freddy's son.

Raffael continues his secret love affair with Femke. When Femke becomes pregnant by Peter, Raffael puts lovage in her food to cause a miscarriage. Doctor Ann informs the police, while Peter makes Femke leave and Raffael is put under psychiatric care. Peggy ends her relationship with Tom after he tried to kidnap Robin. Later, she begins dating Peter which displeases Femke and Tom. Tom begins dating his secretary, Lynn, while Femke becomes depressed and addicted to drugs.

Rosa and Jenny start a bed and breakfast, overcoming the establishment's prior image as a swingers club. Leo moves his taxi company; he falls in love with Jenny and when he tries to inform his girlfriend, Yvette, she suffers a stroke. Some time later, Yvette becomes suspicious and ends their relationship.

Fien and Jens quarrel and she leaves. Her DNA and earring are found in Guy's apartment, and Guy tells Julia that he killed Fien on an impulse. In court Tom convinces the judge that Fien died due to a hereditary heart disease, and Guy is released. Unable to forget Fien, Jens leaves.

Franky's relationship with his new boyfriend, Tibo, is in risk when Tibo learns about Frank's stabbing. They promise not to have secrets, but Tibo is hiding a fifteen-year-old daughter, Jana, who lives with her lesbian mother, Ellen. Franky is shocked but later asks Tibo to marry him, while hiding the fact that Jana is in love with Bram.

Mayra moves in with Ann and starts a jewelry business, but her inventory is stolen by Kasper, the son of Rosa and Waldek, who owes money to criminals. Marianne's husband Geert keeps inviting Mayra's father, David, and Marianne realizes she has feelings for David. Eddy returns and, after successfully hobby-brewing beer with Frank and Waldek, they buy a brewery with Geert and David as investors.

At Franky and Tibo's wedding, the gifts are stolen by Kasper. Marianna and David end up in bed where David suffers a stroke. Jana and Bram are caught together by Tibo. Simmone quarrels with a drunk Frank and is hit by a car driven by Femke, who doesn't notice.

Season 18
Kasper delivers the stolen money to the criminal organization. He finds Simmone who has brain injury. Peggy loans Kasper money to conceal the theft. Femke is interrogated by Tim, who makes a procedural error but Femke is determined to face justice. She is given a large fine and has to sell her loft. She moves in with her mother but after a conflict with Eddy she moves to Tim.

The criminal organization hides drugs in the B&B. Sandrine, believing it is sugar, is rushed to hospital. Ann withdraws Peggy's visitation rights over the incident. Later, Guy holds Sandrine, Mayra and Marianne hostage, which Peggy uses as an argument that the doctor's home is no safer.

Peggy buys pepper spray when she learns that rapist Axel has been released, and uses it on a burglar in her bistro. The burglar, Kasper, falls and dies, and Peggy decides to sell the bistro. Franky and Jens buy the building and open a trendy pub.

After Geert learns his wife Marianne slept with David he wants divorce and leaves the practice, replaced by Judith. David is fired from the brewery, which nears bankruptcy without his knowhow and is sold. David moves away though Marianne refuses to go with him.
Luc is surprised at the sudden appearance of his 16-year-old son, Lowie, whose mother died. Lowie starts a relationship with Jana, who learns she is pregnant by Bram. Against her wishes, Franky gets in touch with Bram who returns, and Jana ultimately chooses to be with Bram. Lowie is taken to hospital after binge drinking and falsely claims that Franky served him alcohol at the pub. Franky and Jens receive a small fine as there was insufficient proof.

Yvette burns her hands and moves into a rest home where her roommate is Madeleine, who has amnesia and diabetes. One day Ann forgets a protocol which leads to Madeleine dying of an insulin overdose, and Ann's medical license is suspended for three months. Geert moves temporary back to the medical practice .

Eddy and Frank are installing fake merchandise and selling the real goods on the Internet. Eddy persuades Luc to continue the swindle. Among the merchandise is a boiler installed at the B&B, which causes Jana to collapse from carbon monoxide poisoning and miscarry.  Eddy is arrested and Frank turns himself in, while Luc feigns ignorance.
Tom tries to seduce Judith to the dismay of his former girlfriend, Lynn. Lynn tells doctor Judith that she was raped by Tom. Lynn's father claims he can save Tom if Marianne marries him, and she agrees. When Lynn learns of this she withdraws her accusation, negating the deal.

Frank and Eddy are released on conditions and want to beat Luc. Lowie is upset with Luc for lying about their past. Jana, Tibo and Bram are furious as proof comes out that Luc knew about the swindle. Everyone is together for Peter and Peggy's wedding, and as they leave the church an unconscious and injured Luc is found.

Season 19
Luc survives, and Jana, Tibo and Bram each confess to his attempted murder. Eventually, Lowie confesses and produces the weapon used. Luc does not charge his son, so Lowie is sentenced to charity work at a library. Despite a court order to stay with Luc, Lowie stays with Julia; he feels betrayed when he learns they are dating again, but reconciles when he realizes they are serious about each other. Frank and Eddy are discharged from the swindle after Luc admits to forcing their participation.

Tibo is fired after trying to suffocate Luc; he leaves with Franky, who assigns Bram to manage the pub. Later, Bram leaves the country; Jana wants to go with him but he sneaks away so she'll finish high school.

Jens begins teaching guitar to fourteen-year-old Emma, who has a crush on him. When Jens tells her he's not interested in her, Emma allows her mother to come to a wrong conclusion and have Jens arrested for pedophilia. Jens is exonerated and Emma moves in with her father.

Frank starts work at an odd-jobs company where a prank with co-workers Adil and Toon leads to his electrocution. Toon is fired and gets a job with Luc's new team-building company, then is reassigned to De Kabouters.

Tim learns Femke is pregnant. He stops her outside a wedding for an alcohol test and catches her in parole violation. Later, Femke is released, still pregnant. It is revealed that Peter is the father and he leaves his wife Peggy to move in with Femke, who delivers a son, Lucas. When Jens moves away, Paulien and Femke take over the pub.

Mayra also wants to have a child, and she and Ann convince Kurt to be a sperm donor but he changes his mind when this becomes public knowledge. Obsessed, Mayra has sex with multiple men, and one night is raped by Kurt. Waldek stops Kurt, and some days later Kurt's body is found in the river, and Waldek remembers pushing him in. Mayra finds she is pregnant by Kurt. Waldek is discharged due to lack of evidence.

Mayra and Marianne have a quarrel and fall from the stairs. Emma is kidnapped by a Facebook chat-friend, possibly Geert. Judith and Tom drive to Geert's country house, but find no trace of Geert or Emma. Peggy kidnaps Lucas at a party and heads to a lake to commit murder-suicide. Rosa and Frank discover what's going on and both drive with their car to the lake. There is a car accident but it is not known who is involved.

Season 20
Rosa has a car accident and is in coma for several weeks. Frank stops Peggy from killing herself and Lucas. Femke starts a lawsuit against Peggy but cannot prove the murder attempt. Peggy is declared non compos mentis and goes to a mental institution.
Tim determines that officer Danny kidnapped Emma. Geert is discharged and wants a divorce as Marianne didn't believe him. Marianne assigns Eddy as her assistant. She accuses Geert of not helping a person in an emergency and has his medical license suspended. She offers Eddy money to beat her so she can accuse Geert of domestic violence. As Eddy refuses Marianne harms herself. Marianne goes to rehabilitation and cancels her complaint. She starts dating William. Geert begins dating Hélène who convinces him to sue Marianne for wage loss, receiving .

Lowie buys a house and rents rooms to Olivia, Paulien, Jana, Tim and Sam. Jana moves back to Frank and Simonne's after learning Lowie cheated on her. Paulien asks Adil and Lowie to pose half naked for a book's cover photo, and they agree as long as their faces aren't shown. However, Lena chooses a photo with Adil's face and persuades Paulien to give approval. Adil feels betrayed, especially when he learns the book is about homosexuality.

Peggy sells her shares in the taxi company which are bought by Femke. Jenny has a heart attack when Luc announces he sold half of his shares in Zus & Zo to Peter. Feeling she is too old Jenny sells her shares to Peggy.

Sam is pregnant and wants an abortion as she was abandoned as an infant. After a conversation with Simonne she decides to keep the baby. Sam searches her biological mother and is upset when it turns out to be Simonne. Simonne was misled by her mother Yvette De Backe when Sam was born.

Julia marries Luc and kicks him out when she learns he has been embezzling from the team-building company. Co-owners Peter and Femke blackmail Luc, threatening to inform the police unless he hands over the property and his shares. Louis determines that Luc drove Leontien off the road and is responsible for her death.

Frank and Simonne hold a 20th anniversary party. Franky returns but won't attend and has shocking news: he's divorced Tibo – and will be undergoing gender reassignment surgery. The party is a success until a video montage shows an inserted confession from Luc asking for forgiveness. Elsewhere, Luc hangs himself.

Geert marries Hélène and William convinces Marianne to marry him. Marianne reads emails on Hélène's phone and suspects she is having a secret affair with a man named Henri and is about to lose . She reveals her suspicions to Geert in front of Hélène and William. Moments later, Ann and Mayra rush in to the sound of screams and find Marianne holding a bloody knife over a dead Geert. Marianne claims Hélène is the killer but Hélène and William say it was Marianne.

Season 21
Luc survives the suicide attempt but has to learn to speak again. Frank convinces Simonne to let Yvette come back into their home.
Marianne is arrested for Geert's murder. Hélène and William have a secret affair and plotted to kill Geert and Marianne to inherit all their possessions. Marianne and William temporarily move to Tuscany. Hélène claims William tried to drown her. Tom confronts William, but Marianne says that William changed his mind and they're really in love. Marianne becomes suspicious when William hides a gun in their home. Confronting him at her 70th birthday party she suffers a cardiac arrest and demands a divorce.
Danny is on trial for kidnapping and sexual misbehaviour to Emma. He escapes during transport and holds Emma and Sam hostage in the De Kabouters warehouse. Toon intervenes when Danny is going to shoot Sam, and is himself shot in the lungs. Police storm in and arrest Danny, who commits suicide in jail.
Lena accepts Jens' wedding proposal which she'd rejected days before. Jens runs to the taxi to give her the engagement ring but is struck by a car driven by Paulien. He dies on Christmas Day at the same time Hannah, daughter of Tim and Sam, is born.

Waldek has lost his feelings for Rosa and moves into Frank's house. Rosa and Peggy suspect Waldek has an affair with Julia, which turns out to be true. Peter and Femke become the owners of the Zus&Zo, kick out Rosa and Peggy and start a new team-building business.

Franky completes gender reassignment and wants to be addressed as Kaat. Frank can't accept Kaat and breaks contact. Toon is intrigued by Kaat until he learns she was a man. Others accept Kaat who starts working for De Withoeve. Frank tries to win back Simonne but she wants a divorce if he won't accept Kaat.

Femke buys the car from Zus & Zo, and has a collision which kills Lucas. Peggy is suspected of tampering with the car, but a drunk Eddy confesses. Eddy is sent to prison and Nancy divorces.

Lowie receives pictures of Olivia and Arne together and becomes jealous. She ends their relationship. Jessica reveals to Tamara that she's sending the pictures with Arne's cooperation. Olivia grows closer to Arne despite not reciprocating his love. At a party, he puts a date rape drug in her drinks and takes pictures whilst raping her.

Femke and Peter's wedding was cancelled due to Lucas' death, and Peter secretly arranges a new ceremony. Femke books their first customer for LEV on the same day and doesn't notice what's happening and leaves. Nancy informs her. Femke feels guilty and reorganizes the wedding.

In agreement with the new attorney at Tom's office, Hélène meets with William to record their conversations. Unaware of this, Tom thinks she is violating her bail conditions. Hélène goes missing and her body is found in William's house. Meanwhile, William tries to suffocate Marianne in her hospital room. Tom catches William but is overpowered.

Season 22
Judith knocks-out William, saving Tom and Marianne. William is arrested. Marianne and Rosa trick him, leading to a fraud investigation and the recovery of Marianne's money.

Arne starts seeing a psychiatrist and Jana, who interns there, learns that Arne drugged Olivia and tells her. Olivia confronts Arne who tries to kill himself. Jana is expelled by the university for ethics violation.

Karen, a new partner in Tom and Peter's law practice, wants to throw Peter out for losing clients. Peter resigns but sells most of his shares to Tom, giving him a majority. In revenge, Karen tries to get Eddy out of jail by saying that he was acting under Peter's orders. At the last moment, Eddy says that Karen manipulated him and does not agree to her plea. Eddy is sentenced to 5 years but is released on probation after several months.

Femke gives birth to a son, Vic. Jenny and Leo visit Bianca in Morocco, where Jenny stays to help during Bianca's pregnancy. The day Jenny returns, she has a fatal stroke. Charité starts a relationship with Renzo but is astonished when her husband -  thought killed in a civil war - appears. Adam faces deportation, having entered the country illegally.

Frank comes to accept Kaat, but Simmone already concluded their marriage is over. Blaming Kaat, Frank attacks her and is stopped by Toon. Yvette confronts Frank over this during which she suffers a heart attack; she dies. Eventually Frank and Simonne move back together, Frank knowing that she had an affair with Waldek. Toon and Kaat start dating, but Toon leaves her brokenhearted with a letter saying he can't return her feelings.

Julia confronts Simonne and Waldek over their affair; they claim it ended and they never had sex, though Julia does not believe them. Julia goes missing and evidence suggests she was murdered by Waldek, who is jailed. Julia appears months later with a Goth makeover, acting like nothing happened. Waldek is released. Sam fires Frank after he has another fight with Waldek.

Tom gets Stan and Emma's help to propose to Judy. Ann and Mayra decide to marry, but a video of Mayra trying to rape Jessica is put on social media, and Ann throws Mayra out. A hearing determines they should have shared custody of Sandrine, which displeases Ann.

Sam's business is almost bankrupt and decides to do a job off the books, but the client refuses to pay since they didn't have a contract. Frank and Youssef demolish the work but are caught by the police.

Julia goes crazy, pouring boiling water over Luc and putting sleeping pills in his cookies, risking his life. Waldek is missing, shown bound, and the police suspect Eddy and Frank.

Karen's estranged brother, Kobe, arrives to tell her that their mother died. He starts working as a cook at De Withoeve. During a business lunch with Steven Lambrechts, it is revealed that Kobe is actually Karen's son and Steven is his father.

Season 23
Luc appeals to an escort but she eats a poisoned cookie and dies. Waldek is captured by Julia who threatens revenge on all who harmed her. She reveals to have killed her ex-husband. Julia sends Mayra poisoned chocolates resulting Mayra and Sandrine are being admitted to hospital. Rosa discovers evidence in Julia's cookbook and informs the police, who arrest her.
Karen explains her mother raised Kobe as Steven was engaged to another woman and she didn't feel she could raise Kobe. Steven informs Karen he has ALS which Kobe may have inherited. Kobe can't handle this and starts taking drugs. Kobe blames Kaat when he is fired and tells Karen he killed Kaat. Kaat is found alive and taken to hospital.
Tom and Judith marry, but the reception is a disaster. Ann is furious there's no place for her lover, Jessica, and their relationship is slighted in Marianne's speech, provoking Ann to propose marriage. Jessica breaks off the relationship, feeling that she's treated as a trophy. Ann declares that Tom and Karen are having an affair. Judith is heartbroken and leaves Tom, while Ann pressures Judith to kick Marianne out of the house. Judith wants an immediate divorce. The judge orders that they share their belongings, so a furious Judith saws their furniture in half. They sell their house which is bought by Ann. Without asking, Marianne moves in at Tom's place. Stan can convince his mother to sign papers so Tom becomes his adoption father.
After a medical test, it turns out Adil his semen is of low quality so he and Paulien start an In vitro fertilization-treatment. Luc does not want to live anymore and he signs papers to get a euthanasia. His last wish is to go on a road trip with Lowie and Frank. He dies on their way to Valencia.
Marianne and Leo are sure Tom spoils Stan too much. Since he moved in at Tom's house, Stan became a rude boy with many strings on his bow. When Leo confronts Stan, Stan tells him he had hoped Marianne died when she was taken into hospital. Leo cuffs his ear. Stan, feigning to have a brain concussion, convinces Tom to inform the police.
Mayra gives birth to Zoë. Afraid the baby will have disability due to the poisoned cookies, she switches the newborn with another. Some weeks later she learns that their daughter died, but carries on as if nothing is wrong. After a blood test on Zoë, Waldek gets suspicious about Zoë's blood group. Doctor Judith confirms Waldek can't be the father. Mayra flees away with Zoë but loses control over the car and crashes in a ditch. Whilst still in the car, she confesses Zoë is neither her child. The car gets on fire. At same time, Leo wants to apologize Stan for hitting him. Stan pushes Leo against the wall breaking his skull. Stan leaves the house as nothing has happened. A bleeding unconscious Leo is found by Marianne and Tom.

Season 24
Leo survives the attack. Waldek is able to save Mayra and Zoë from the car. He demands her to leave so she moves to Cape Verde.

Dries starts working at the law firm, but his real intention is to sue Karin as she committed fraud in a case in which Dries his father (and many other people) should have gotten a huge amount of money which she darkened. He succeeds and she is suspended for a year.

Tamara is pregnant of Bob. When she informs him he ends their relationship as he does not want a child yet. After babysitting for Emile, a pupil in Olivia's class whose father Lander works at the taxi company, Bob realizes he does like children. He pleases Tamara to restart their relationship but she rejects.

Steven marries Rosa. As his ALS takes overhand, he commits euthanasia. Just before dying he bought a villa in Spain for Rosa and Kobe. This is noticed by tax inspection who thinks the villa was paid with dark money. They start up an investigation and all the financials of "Stevenson", the wine company of Steven and Kobe, are frozen. It turns out no fraud was committed.

Frank gets carjacked. Some weeks later he is attacked again in his home by the same person as he recognizes the gloves. Frank is shocked when those gloves are in the backpack of Emile. The police is called to interrogate Lander. Lander takes Olivia and Sandrine as hostages. Sandrine is shot by Dieter by accident and dies. He decides to stop as a police officer and reopens the pub in "De Withoeve". Olivia and Lowie become the adoptive parents until Emile pushes a pregnant Paulien from the stairs by accident. She loses the child and her uterus. She becomes depressed, stops her relationship with Adil, neglects her pub...

Judith started a relationship with Jacques, the coach of the swimming club. After a quarrel with Jacques, Judith gets some bruising on her wrists. When Judith gets some broken ribs, Ann informs Emma and Tom. Everybody is blaming Jacques for mistreating Judith. Stan claims Jacques made a sexual approach to him and thus a pedophile. Nobody understands why Judith still defends Jacques until it turns out Stan is the wrongdoer. Joren figures out he is gay and in love with Stan which seems to be mutual.

Bob starts a relationship with Christine. Nobody likes Christine as she is a manipulator, gossip, faked a pregnancy of Bob and also faked the abortion. She also brought Olivia more than once in discredit only to get better herself. Lowie finds out Bob is still in love with Tamara. Olivia finds out Tamara still has feelings for Bob.

Bill, the alcoholic father of Joren, wants to rejoin with him, but Joren is not impressed.  One day Stan, Joren and another friend drink lots of hard liquor. Joren, who was to be at school, misses a school test. Bill finds the three who run by bicycle. Joren falls over the train rails. Bill runs upon the rails but is hit by a train and taken into hospital.

In season's finale it is insinuated Bill died. Stan tells Joren not to be gay and it was just for fun.  Bob and Christine marry. Olivia stops the ceremony and tells everyone Bob is still in love with Tamara and that Tamara just gave birth to his child. Bob wants to leave the town hall, but Christine claims she is also pregnant.

Season 25
Due to COVID-19 the complete season could not be recorded so the season ended on 24 April 2020 instead of 11th of June. As filming was no longer possible the producers had to be inventive with the material they had, resulting in a choppy storyline in last episodes.

The wedding between Bob and Christine takes place as she is pregnant. After a blood test it turns out she is not pregnant at all and there is even no proof in her blood she was pregnant lately. Due to this lie, Bob wants to divorce immediately.

Jacques tries to drown Stan in the pool but is stopped by Joren. Stan quits school and gets a job at Stevenson but he does not like it. Next he starts homeschooling but also gives up after some weeks. Finally he joins the army. Kaat did not pass her examinations and stops her course in favor to do a world travel trip.

Pauline starts a relationship with Kobe and they marry. They have the intention to adopt a child.  Bianca and Mo, who live in Morocco since several years, die in a car accident. Their son Robin is adopted by Tom De Decker, his biological father.

Dries got his master's degree and stops his job as gigolo which does not suit one of his clients: Reinhilde. She turns in a complaint claiming Dries got lots of extra money and presents from her. As this is considered to be legal profit she hints the police Dries did not pay taxes on these extras and most probably did not turn in all of his profits. The tax department starts an investigation but it turns out Dries does not have black money and he is in rule with law.

At Bowie Dries is hired for the position of lawyer consultant. Karin is still angry at Dries because of his actions in previous season. Reinhilde attacks Dries sexually and then sets up a plan with Karin to prove Dries is the wrongdoer and raped Reinhilde. Customers of Bowie get knowledge of the twisted story and want to stop their projects so Dries is fired. After investigation it is proved Karin spread the rumor to those customers. Reinhilde gets remorse and wants to withdraw her statement which does not please Karin. That's why Reinhilde does not want to work any longer with Karin. Tom is informed about the fake acquisitions and wants to stop his partnership with Karin. As she rejects, he starts up a procedure so she never can be a lawyer again. He gets support from Reinhilde, Dries and Peter.

To everyone's surprise Adil started a relationship with Christine. An astonished Bob decides Bowie will not work with The Kabouters anymore.

Jasper, the boxing teacher of Ann, is found guilty of the murder on the manageress of pub "Bar Madam", the rape on Tilly and sales of drugs. All of this is proved in a setup arranged by his daughter Viv and the police. Jasper admits the selling of the drugs, claims the death was an accident but claims he did not rape Tilly. In a flashback it is revealed to the viewers Jacques was the wrongdoer. Jasper is sent to jail. Jacques starts a part-time job as real estate salesman in the company of Reinhilde and goes to Spain for some time to sell some houses.

In last episode Jasper is set free due to procedural errors. Viv is upset and is sure Jasper will come after her. A severe accident takes place. Policeman Tim only reveals the victim is someone he knows.

Season 26
Tania reveals she was raped a long time ago and got pregnant. Her son Xander is now in search of his father and is in a rage when he hears about how he was impregnated. After a DNA-test reveals Walter De Decker was the rapist, Xander starts strangling Tania. Doctor Ann interferes and by killing him she saves Tania's life. The act is ruled as self-defense. As Marianne always knew about the rape, Ann moves abroad.

Frank and Simonne decide to move to an apartment and sell their house. Due to an issue with a fuse "De Kabouters" are hired to fix the electric cabin. Joren - who did the job - had to leave early so Frank finished the job. The house burns down due to a short circuit and Frank did not pay the invoice of the fire insurance.

Lowie starts dating the drug addicted Roxanne Goethals, sister of BOWIE's most important customer. Lowie realizes he must end the relationship so he does. An upset Roxanne puts drugs in Lowie his cup of tea. Lowie ends up in hospital but survives. Mister Goethals thinks Lowie started with drugs so he decides to stop all business with BOWIE. Harry Peeters also stops his project, but as he convinced Louis to make some changes in the standard contract, he does not have to pay BOWIE at all. Roxanne is interrogated by the police. Afterwards she is found dead in a burned out car.

A charming man brings a visit to pub "Bar Madam" but steals money from the till so Angèle is temporary fired as she was responsible. Eddy runs into that man and they start a fight. Eddy gets a huge hit on his head and can't smell anything for a couple of months.

Totally unexpected Nina stands in front of Leo. She is with her child Yasmine on the run from Interpol as she is found guilty of a huge swindle. She claims she was framed by her mother. Things get more complicated when it turns out Peter impregnated Nina and he is aware of the fathership. This leads to a break between Peter and Femke.

Dieter concludes Jacques is involved in the murder of Jasper. Jacques finds out the police is shadowing him thus flees away. Reinhilde is also found dead and Dries is the heir according her will, making him rich.

Jacques holds Rosa and Waldek but is shot down by Dieter. He falls in the river and is assumed dead. However, he survived but the bullet is still in his body. He enters some house and forces the owner to call doctor Judith who comes over. Jacques kills the owner and holds Judith as a hostage. She is freed by Waldek and Tilly after Judith was able to send a text message. Once outside, they run into Jacques, but the police also arrives and Jacques is shot dead. In the season's finale the viewer is informed Rosa is abducted by Jacques and hold somewhere else. Leo and Marianne marry.

Season 27
On his wedding day Leo gets a stroke and dies. The police starts an investigation after the missing Rosa but it is Waldek who finds her in Jacques his car. Christine has a partial miscarriage: one of the twins died in the uterus. Due to this, the other baby had to be born via a Caesarean section. Christine has no bondage with the child and she is taken into a psychiatric institute for undefined time.

Ilias, a nephew of Dieter, is arrested by police for driving a souped-up moped. He is a rather rude, wagging school young man who decided to leave his last year in high school until he meets Silke on which he has a crush. She admits or feigns to also have feelings for Ilias but he must prove himself by doing all kind of wager tasks such as going to class in a womans outfit.

Silke, who studies laws at university, gets Karin as one of her teachers. Silke spreads all kind of gossips about Karen, posts photoshopped images of her via social media... Karin wants to take revenge but figures out Silke is the daughter of dean Stefaan Le Grand.

A fighting divorce starts between Femke and Peter about who is going to raise Vic. Peter does not want Kobe around Vic due to his past. Karin is not upset Peter puts Kobe in a bad light and starts helping Femke to get as much as sche can. Karin also starts up a procedure to clear Kobe his criminal record.

Season 28

Current cast

Former main cast
The list is limited to characters which appeared in the opening credits.

Family trees
Bomans family tree

Florke Rousseau (deceased 2003) married Stafke Bomans (deceased), married Roger Van De Wiele (deceased 2002) (1999–2002, his death)
  Frank Bomans
   Bianca Bomans (born CIR 1976) out of marriage with Jenny Verbeeck (?–1996, divorced due to his affair with Simonne)
   Peggy Verbeeck (born CIR 1976) out of an affair with Rosa Verbeeck
   Franky Bomans (born 1998) out of marriage with Simonne Backx (m.1999–2007, separated in 2006, signed divorce papers on 1 June 2007) but remarried her.
  Luc Bomans
 Unborn child from rape of Simonne Backx
 Lowie Bomans (born 2003) from marriage with Leontien Vercammen (m.2001 onwards, separated 2003–2005, 2007 onwards after his affair with Marie Van Goethem).  Leontien ran away abroad and took Lowie with her.

Bastiaens family tree

 Marianne Bastiaens  and Walter De Decker (m. ? – 1997, his death, separated 1990–1995).  She remarried with Geert Smeekens, the father of Sandrine Verbeelen.
 Ann De Decker dating Sandrine Verbeelen (2007) who died of an intracranial hemorrhage.  Ann started a new relation with Mayra (2011).  Ann adopted the baby of Peggy and called her Sandrine.
 Tom De Decker who is together with Peggy.
 Charles Bastiaens married ? (separated)
 Sara Bastiaens
 Frederique Bastiaens
 Claire Bastiaens
 Carlos Bastiaens
 ? Bastiaens
 Eric Bastiaens
 Michaël Bastiaens (son from Eric Bastiaens' first marriage)
 Sam Bastiaens (born CIR 1984) from marriage to Martine Lefever (m.?–2005, remarried 2007–)
 Sofie Bastiaens (born CIR 1986) with Martine Lefever

Bomans/Verbeeck/Backx

Bastiaens/De Decker

Production

Music
Season 13 had a new intro and theme tune sung by Sofie Van Moll and rock artist Peter Evrard. The new song was created by Will Tura and Steve Willaert with lyrics by Frank Dingenen, an actor who had played a guest role which he reprised at the start of season 13.

References

External links
Thuis
Thuisforum
Site from Gismo, a thuisfan
Fansite for Luc Bomans

1990s Belgian television series
1995 Belgian television series debuts
Belgian drama television shows1
Eén original programming